The Burlington County Courthouse is located in Mount Holly, the county seat of Burlington County, New Jersey, U.S., which itself is coterminous with the 3rd vicinage.
The historic courthouse continues to handle judicial proceedings.

The building was constructed in 1796 under the direction of Michael Rush. Its architect, Samuel Lewis, designed the building as a virtual identical twin of Congress Hall and Old City Hall, the buildings flanking Independence Hall in Philadelphia. The courthouse bell, removed and installed from an earlier courthouse, rang for independence in 1776.

It is a contributing property to the Mount Holly Historic District, listed on the New Jersey Register of Historic Places (#842) and National Register of Historic Places (#73001084) in 1973. and has been documented by the Historic American Buildings Survey (HABS NJ-27).

See also
List of the oldest courthouses in the United States
County courthouses in New Jersey
Federal courthouses in New Jersey
Richard J. Hughes Justice Complex
National Register of Historic Places listings in Burlington County, New Jersey

References 

County courthouses in New Jersey
Government buildings completed in 1796
Federal architecture in New Jersey
Mount Holly, New Jersey
National Register of Historic Places in Burlington County, New Jersey
1796 establishments in New Jersey
New Jersey Register of Historic Places
Courthouses on the National Register of Historic Places in New Jersey
Buildings and structures in Burlington County, New Jersey
Historic district contributing properties in New Jersey